Fabien Lamatina (born 3 July 1985, in La Seyne-sur-Mer) is a retired French professional football player.

Lamatina made a total of 30 league appearances for Stade Lavallois in Ligue 2 from 2009 to 2011.

References

External links
 

1985 births
Living people
People from La Seyne-sur-Mer
French footballers
French expatriate footballers
Expatriate footballers in Spain
Ligue 2 players
Racing de Ferrol footballers
Stade Lavallois players
Marignane Gignac Côte Bleue FC players
Association football midfielders
Sportspeople from Var (department)
Footballers from Provence-Alpes-Côte d'Azur